Craniella elegans is a species of marine sponges in the family Tetillidae. The type locality is between southern India and Sri Lanka (Gulf of Mannar).

References

External links
 Craniella elegans at the World Register of Marine Species (WoRMS)

Spirophorida
Sponges described in 1905
Fauna of India
Invertebrates of Sri Lanka